A light-emitting transistor or LET is a form of transistor that emits light. Higher efficiency than light-emitting diode (LED) is possible.

History
Reported in the January 5, 2004 issue of the journal Applied Physics Letters, Milton Feng and Nick Holonyak, the inventor of the first practical light-emitting diode (LED) and the first semiconductor laser to operate in the visible spectrum, made the world's first light-emitting transistor. This hybrid device, fabricated by Feng's graduate student Walid Hafez, had one electrical input and two outputs (electrical output and optical output) and operated at a frequency of 1 MHz. The device was made of indium gallium phosphide, indium gallium arsenide, and gallium arsenide, and emitted infrared photons from the base layer.

See also
Organic light-emitting transistor

References

Light sources
Optoelectronics